Philidris laevigata is a species of ant in the genus Philidris. Described by Emery in 1895, the species is endemic to Burma, India and China.

References

Dolichoderinae
Insects described in 1895
Hymenoptera of Asia
Insects of India
Insects of Myanmar
Insects of China